Rhinoporidae is an extinct family of bryozoans within the order Cystoporata. There are currently 3 genera assigned to the family. Members of this family have lived from the Ordovician to the Devonian.

Genera 

 †Lichenalia 
 †Rhinopora 
 †Rhinoporella

References 

Cystoporida
Bryozoan families
Prehistoric bryozoans
Paleozoic invertebrates
Ordovician bryozoans
Silurian bryozoans
Devonian bryozoans